C-League may refer to:

Canadian Soccer League - Canadian soccer league
Chinese Super League - Chinese soccer league
Cambodian League - Cambodian soccer league